The Ipswich and Rosewood line refers to the section of the Main Line to Toowoomba that has a regular suburban rail service, extending southwest from the Brisbane central business district. It is part of the Queensland Rail City network.

History

Main Line
The Main Line railway from Ipswich to Brisbane was opened in 1876, as part of an extension of the first railway line from Ipswich to Bigge's Camp (now Grandchester) on 31 July 1865.

Originally built as single track, the section was duplicated from 1885 to 1887, indicating how quickly the traffic volume grew on the line. The Albert Bridge was built to accommodate two tracks in 1876, though only one was laid at the time.

The line west of Ipswich was duplicated to Wulkuraka in 1902 and to Grandchester (past Rosewood) in 1913.

The section from Roma Street to Corinda ( was quadruplicated in 1963, and extended to Darra (a further ) in 2011, which became the junction for the first section of the new Springfield line at that time.

The Roma Street–Darra section was the first section electrified in 1979, with the section to Ipswich electrified in 1980.

The line was electrified from Ipswich to Rosewood in 1993 while Minister for Transport was the local member.

Branch lines
The Brisbane Valley railway line, branching from the Main Line after Wulkuraka railway station, was opened to Lowood in 1884, Esk in 1886, and Yarraman in 1913.  Passenger services operated to Toogoolawah until 1989, and freight services until closure of the line in sections in 1988 and 1993.

It was closed in sections from 1964 to 1995, and some of it is today the Rosewood Railway Museum; the Museum Junction station is at the truncated southern end of the line before Railway Street.

A line to a coal loading balloon loop at Ebenezer was opened in 1990, junctioning from the Main Line west of Thagoona railway station.

The initial section of the Springfield railway line from Darra to Richlands was opened one week early in January 2011 to assist with transportation when the Main Line between Darra and Ipswich was closed due to severe flooding. The Richlands–Springfield section opened in 2013.

A new branch line has been proposed on an alignment extending south from Ipswich to Yamanto, then east to Ripley, and connecting with the Springfield line.

Route and stations
Most services originate in Ipswich and stop at all stations to Bowen Hills railway station. The typical travel time between Ipswich and Brisbane City is approximately 58 minutes (to Central). Rosewood services typically act as a shuttle between Rosewood and Ipswich stations, with selected peak direction services continuing through Ipswich.  The typical travel time between Rosewood and Ipswich is 18 minutes.

During weekday peak times, a number of the Ipswich services skip stations between Darra and Milton, stopping only at Indooroopilly for faster travel times for commuters working in the Brisbane central business district.

Passengers for/from the Rosewood line change at Ipswich, Beenleigh, Gold Coast and Cleveland lines at Roma Street, and all other lines at Bowen Hills.

Former service to Corinda via South Brisbane

The Corinda–Yeerongpilly railway line, also known as the Tennyson line, connects the Beenleigh and Ipswich lines for coal, grain and intermodal freight services to the Port of Brisbane and Acacia Ridge intermodal terminal. It was the only connection between the northern and southern portions of the Brisbane suburban network until the Merivale Bridge opened in 1978. Commuter services were defunct in 2011 due to low patronage.

Gallery

References

External links
TransLink - About trains

Brisbane railway lines
Public transport in Brisbane